MMPA is an acronym that may refer to:

 Marine Mammal Protection Act
 Copyright Term Extension Act (also known as the Mickey Mouse Protection Act)
 Matched molecular pair analysis (in Cheminformatics)